Jacob Matschenz (born 1984, Berlin) is a German actor. He is notable for film and television work including The Wave (2008), 12 Paces Without a Head (2009) and The Sinking of the Laconia (2010). He won the Adolf Grimme Award in 2008 for his appearance in An die Grenze.

Filmography

Film

References

External links

Living people
Male actors from Berlin
1984 births
German male film actors
German male television actors